Northern Patrol is a 1953 American Northern film directed by Rex Bailey and starring Kirby Grant, Marian Carr and William Phipps. The film was the ninth in a series of ten films featuring Kirby Grant as a Canadian Mountie.

Cast
 Kirby Grant as Corporal Rod Webb, RCMP  
 Marian Carr as Quebec Kid  
 William Phipps as Frank Stevens 
 Claudia Drake as Oweena 
 Dale Van Sickel as Jason 
 Gloria Talbott as Meg Stevens 
 Richard Walsh as Constable Ralph Gregg  
 Emmett Lynn as Dad  
 Frank Lackteen as Dancing Horse 
 Frank Sully as Bartender  
 Chinook as Chinook, Webb's dog

See also
 Trail of the Yukon (1949)
 The Wolf Hunters (1949)
 Snow Dog (1950)
 Call of the Klondike (1950)
 Northwest Territory (1951)
 Yukon Manhunt (1951)
 Yukon Gold (1952)
 Fangs of the Arctic (1953)
 Yukon Vengeance (1954)

References

Bibliography
 Drew, Bernard. Motion Picture Series and Sequels: A Reference Guide. Routledge, 2013.

External links
 

1953 films
1953 Western (genre) films
Allied Artists films
American Western (genre) films
American black-and-white films
Corporal Rod Webb (film series)
Films based on American novels
Films based on works by James Oliver Curwood
Films directed by Rex Bailey
Films produced by Lindsley Parsons
Northern (genre) films
Royal Canadian Mounted Police in fiction
1950s English-language films
1950s American films